Related articles include:
 Societal collapse
 Cultural assimilation